HWR may refer to:
 Berlin School of Economics and Law
 Handwriting recognition
 Hereford and Worcester, former county in England, Chapman code
 Heavy-water reactor
 Henley Women's Regatta
 Heroes Wear Red, a South African rock band